Karl Simon Forsström (born 1 April 1989) is a Swedish professional golfer and European Tour player.

Amateur career
Forsström played for AIK Golf Club. He started competing on the Swedish Teen Tour in 2004 and was runner-up at the 2008 Alex Norén Junior Open. In 2009, he won the Viksjö Junior Open and the Skandia Tour Riks #4 - Stockholm.

Professional career

2009–2015: Nordic Golf League
Forsström turned professional in 2009. He played in the European Tour Qualifying School every year during 2008–16, but spent his formative years on the satellite Nordic Golf League.

In 2011, he finished 3rd at the Gant Open in Finland, and in 2012 he was runner-up at the Nordea Open in Norway, three strokes behind Kristoffer Broberg.

He won once and finished runner-up three times in the 2015 Nordic Golf League. His fifth-place finish on the Order of Merit earned him a Challenge Tour card for 2016.

2016–2022: Challenge Tour
In 2016, Forsström made an eagle on the penultimate hole to card a 7-under-par 64 on the final day of the KPMG Trophy, to secure a maiden victory on the Challenge Tour, two strokes ahead of Steven Tiley.

On 15 August 2016, after a 7th place finish at the Vierumäki Finnish Challenge on the Challenge Tour in Finland, he reached a career best 355th in the Official World Golf Ranking. The year after he finished lone runner-up at the same tournament, his second best performance during his career. 

In 2018, his best finish was tied 3rd at the D+D Real Czech Challenge. In 2022 he was tied 2nd at the Frederikshavn Challenge and tied 4th at the British Challenge.

2023: European Tour
Forsström won the 2022 European Tour Qualifying School Final Stage in Tarragona, Spain, by two strokes with a score of 29-under-par over six rounds, earning him a European Tour card for the 2023 season.

He finished T9 at the Joburg Open and T4 at the AfrAsia Bank Mauritius Open, to end the 2022 calendar year 17th in the Race to Dubai standings.

Amateur wins
2009 Viksjö Junior Open, Skandia Tour Riks #4 - Stockholm

Professional wins (4)

Challenge Tour wins (1)

Nordic Golf League wins (2)

Other wins (1)
2011 Högtorp Cup (Kumla Golf Club, Swedish Golf Ranking)

See also
2022 European Tour Qualifying School graduates

References

External links

Swedish male golfers
European Tour golfers
Golfers from Stockholm
1989 births
Living people